Nuq District is a district (bakhsh) in Rafsanjan County, Kerman Province, Iran. At the 2006 census, its population was 11,361, in 2,840 families.  The district has one city: Bahreman. The district has one rural district (dehestan): Bahreman Rural District.

Former Iranian president, Akbar Hashemi Rafsanjani was born at Bahreman, in Nuq District.

References 

Rafsanjan County
Districts of Kerman Province